Artificial is a 2012 Telugu short film that was produced and directed by Vijay Vemuri. The film had its world debut on 27 April 2012 and revolves around the fantasies of a young couple.

Synopsis
A beautiful young housewife (Supriya Aysola) finds herself bored with her daily life and routine. As an escape she comes up with various daydreams and fantasies to make herself and the people around her more exciting.

Cast
 Supriya Aysola as Housewife
 Abhinav Gomatam as Manav
 Mahesh Kumar Kathi as Therapist
 Deepti Naidu as Salesgirl
 Kranthi as Male Customer
 Shwetha Chowdary as the slum-dwelling woman
 Rohan as Rag-Picker

Production
Vijay filmed the movie using a Canon 5D that he had rented due to having a budget of only ₹250,000. He did not begin filming until four years after he had finished the movie's script, as it took him a while to find a cast and crew that he felt could help him make the movie. Casting took almost two years to complete and Vijay eventually chose actress Supriya Aysola to perform in the film's lead role. Of the film's inspiration, Vijay has stated that he was inspired from a late-night television show that dealt with "extreme psycho-sexual disorders".

Awards
Platinum Reel Award for Best Short Film at the Nevada Film Festival (2012, won)

References

External links

Interview with Hyderabad Hybiz.tv

2012 drama films
2010s Telugu-language films
2012 short films
2012 films
Indian drama films